The Ministry of Construction is a ministry in the Burmese government responsible for the country's construction and maintenance of infrastructure, including roads and bridges.

Departments
As of 2019, the Ministry of Construction oversees the following departments:
 Minister's Office
 Department of Building
 Department of Highways
 Department of Bridge
 Department of Urban and Housing Development 
 Department of Rural Road Development

References

External links
 Ministry of Construction (Myanmar) on Facebook

Construction
Myanmar
Ministries established in 1972
1972 establishments in Burma